Maslimomab is a mouse monoclonal antibody and an immunosuppressive drug. It is an anti-human T-cell receptor alpha/beta chain.

References

Monoclonal antibodies